The Freedom 25 is an American sailboat that was designed by Gary Hoyt as a single-handed racer-cruiser and first built in 1980.

Production
The design was built by Tillotson Pearson for Freedom Yachts in the United States, but it is now out of production.

Design
The Freedom 25 is a recreational keelboat, built predominantly of fiberglass, with wood trim. It has a catboat rig or optional fractional sloop rig with a staysail, a spooned raked stem, a vertical transom, a transom-hung rudder controlled by a tiller and a fixed fin keel. It carries  of lead ballast.

The spars are carbon fiber. The mast is unstayed, has an airfoil cross-section shape and rotates on earlier models. The mainsail is fully battened and lowers into lazy jacks. A spinnaker is used, flown from an unusual pole that extends though a "gun mount" sleeve mounted to the steel framed pulpit and is not attached to the mast. This arrangement means that spinnaker winches are not needed and the spinnaker can be raised from the cockpit. The spinnaker pole retracts when not in use, stowing along the lifeline.

The boat is fitted with an optional diesel engine or a small outboard motor for docking and maneuvering.

The accommodations consist of two cabin berths that are partly under the cockpit and a forward "V"-berth. There is a small galley fitted, with a two-burner stove, portable cooler and a private head. The cabin sole is teak and holly, while the bulkheads and other trim are painted white or made from ash.

Operational history
In a 2010 review Steve Henkel wrote, "Garry Hoyt, main designer and marketer of the Freedom line of sailboats, is known as a free thinker when it comes to sailboat design. The Freedom 25, with her full-battened mainsail, small 'staysail' jib, 'gunmount' spinnaker handling gear, and unstayed mast, is a good example of the fruition of Hoyt's thinking. Hoyt says full-length battens have several advantages, the main one being ease of reefing, 'A sailor wants a sail he can get up and get down quickly, a sail that is easy to handle, can be reefed easily, and provides acceptable performance.' The fully battened sails are quieter too. The little jib, which was an option on new boats, improves upwind performance in light air. The gunmount makes using a spinnaker a singlehanded job: one sailor can hoist, jibe, and douse the spinnaker without ever leaving the cockpit. The unstayed mast simplifies the rig and makes getting underway faster. Best features: Besides the above, the cockpit is deep and comfortable, with good back support. Worst features: The wing mast and sail sleeves on early boats didn't work out. Consequently, a conventional sailtrack on a round mast was used on most production."

Variants
Freedom 25 Staysail
This model was introduced in 1980. It displaces  and carries  of ballast. The boat has a PHRF racing average handicap of 213 with a high of 198 and low of 228.
Freedom 25
This model was introduced in 1981. It displaces  and carries  of ballast. The boat has a PHRF racing average handicap of 210 with a high of 237 and low of 201.

See also
List of sailing boat types

Similar sailboats
Bayfield 25
Bombardier 7.6
Cal 25
Cal 2-25
Catalina 25
Catalina 250
Com-Pac 25
Dufour 1800
Hunter 25.5
Jouët 760
Kelt 7.6
MacGregor 25
Merit 25
Mirage 25
Northern 25
O'Day 25
Sirius 26
Tanzer 25
US Yachts US 25
Watkins 25

References

Keelboats
1980s sailboat type designs
Sailing yachts
Sailboat type designs by Gary Hoyt
Sailboat types built by Pearson Yachts